Defying Gravity is a 2008 independent film directed by Michael Keller and produced by Balancing Act Pictures. It was accepted into eleven film festivals and won four awards.

Plot 
Cassandra, a mute runaway girl, takes refuge in the Jewish cemetery in which her mother is laid to rest. She is watched over by Jorge, the cemetery caretaker, an illegal immigrant. Shore is a dynamic, handsome, and brilliant young man who also happens to be homeless. After almost hitting Cassandra in his dilapidated VW bus, he becomes fascinated by the gothic cemetery waif and attempts to befriend her.

A sequence of events results in Cass getting lost. Jorge and Shore flee the cemetery in a stolen hearse to find Cassandra before her abusive stepfather does. All paths lead to Yermo, California - the site of a roadside diner and a feisty but compassionate transvestite waitress named Lola.

Cast 
Alexandra Mathews as Cassandra
Willam Belli as Lola
Macauley Gray as Shore
Mario Martinez as Jorge
Tony Franchitto (credited as Anthony Franchitto) as Lubitch
Andrew Torres as Menendez
Bea Bernstein as Psychic Lady
Sara Corder as Destry
Michael Francesco as Sebastian
Ellen Gedert as Social Worker
Andrew Hawley as Mercurio
Ariel James as Zoe
Mike McNamee as Penlorion
Liniana Montenegro as Ofelia
Carlos Luis Orrala as Arnulfo
Joey Rivas as Pedro
Tara Saunders as Edwina
Jane Shepherd as Miss Grace

Awards

Digital Video and Hi Def Festival 2008 - Best Story/Writing
Fallbrook Film Festival 2008 - Director's Choice
Action on Film International Film Festival 2008 2008 - Best LGBT Project
Paso Robles Digital Film Festival 2008 - Festival Choice Award
Wildwood By The Sea Film Festival 2008 - Best Narrative Feature
Riverside International Film Festival 2008 - Official Selection
Feel Good Film Festival 2008 - Official Selection
Other Venice Film Festival 2008 - Official Selection
LA Femme Film Festival 2008 - Official Selection
Red Rock Film Festival 2008 - Official Selection
Beverly Hills Digital and Hi-Def Festival 2008 - Official Selection

References 
[http://nctimes.com/articles/2008/04/23/entertainment/movies/bbe7f0830457f1958825743300767ae0.txt Defying Gravity' among good choices at Fallbrook Film Fest], Dan Bennett, North County Times; 23 April 2008
Defying convention : Menifee math teacher produces film praising individuality and unity, Peter Surowski, The Temecula Valley News; 20 June 2008Defying the Odds: How a Middle-Aged Math Teacher Became an Indie Producer on 'Defying Gravity, Indie Slate Magazine; March/April 2008
'Defying Gravity' official web site
"Feel Good Film Festival" official website"

External links

2008 films
American independent films
2000s English-language films
2000s American films